Amukhanzi-ye Olya (also Romanized as ‘Amūkhānzī-ye ‘Olyā) is a village in Chaldoran-e Jonubi Rural District, in the Central District of Chaldoran County, West Azerbaijan Province, Iran. At the 2006 census, its population was 90, in 21 families.

References 

Populated places in Chaldoran County